HMS Woolwich was a 44-gun fifth-rate ship of the Royal Navy. She was built by Moody Janverin and John Darley at Bucklers Hard on the Beaulieu River in Hampshire, England and launched 7 March 1749. She took part in the unsuccessful attack on Martinique in January 1759.

She was sold on 30 December 1762.

References

External links
 

Ships of the line of the Royal Navy
1749 ships
Ships built on the Beaulieu River